Taillefer et filles is a television series is hosted by Claudette Taillefer and her daughter Marie-Josée Taillefer. It aired on Télé-Québec and was produced by Guy Cloutier. This series was made in 1994 under the name Bon appétit! and renamed to Taillefer & filles, in 1998.

References
Claudette Taillefer - Cuisine du Quebec

Television shows filmed in Quebec
1990s Canadian cooking television series
Télé-Québec original programming